Chasen David Bradford (born August 5, 1989), sometimes known as Chase, is an American former professional baseball pitcher who previously played in Major League Baseball (MLB) for the New York Mets and Seattle Mariners and in the Atlantic League of Professional Baseball for the High Point Rockers.

Early life
Bradford was born to Lauren and Doug Bradford in Las Vegas, Nevada, and graduated from Silverado High School in 2008. Bradford played college baseball at the College of Southern Nevada and then the University of Central Florida. In 2011, as a senior at UCF, Bradford went 6–2 with a 5.30 ERA in 52.2 innings.

Professional career

New York Mets
Bradford was drafted by the New York Mets in the 35th round of the 2011 MLB draft and signed for $1,000. He made his professional debut that same year for the Kingsport Mets and spent the whole season there, compiling a 3.51 ERA in 33.1 innings pitched. In 2012, he pitched for the Savannah Sand Gnats where he was 4–5 with a 2.47 ERA in 37 relief appearances, and in 2013, he played with both the St. Lucie Mets and Binghamton Mets where he pitched to a combined 9–3 record and 2.61 ERA in 69 innings pitched out of the bullpen. Bradford spent 2014 with Binghamton and the Las Vegas 51s where he was 4–4 with a 2.97 ERA in 57 appearances, 2015 with Las Vegas where he posted a 5–4 record and 4.10 ERA in 53 relief appearances, and 2016 back with Las Vegas where he was 5–3 with a 4.80 ERA in 65.2 relief innings pitched. He began 2017 with Las Vegas.

Bradford was called up to the majors for the first time on June 22, 2017. He made his major league debut on June 25 against the San Francisco Giants at AT&T Park, striking out Nick Hundley and Denard Span in a scoreless ninth inning. He was sent down to Las Vegas on July 17 and recalled on August 1, and spent the remainder of the season there. Bradford recorded his first major league win on August 2 against the Colorado Rockies at Coors Field. In 28 appearances for the Mets he was 2–0 with a 3.74 ERA.

Bradford was designated for assignment by the Mets on January 18, 2018.

Seattle Mariners
Bradford was claimed off waivers by the Seattle Mariners on January 19, 2018. He began the season with the Tacoma Rainers and was recalled by Seattle on April 9. In 46 games for Seattle, he finished 5–0 in  innings. In August 2019, Bradford underwent Tommy John surgery, causing him to miss the rest of the 2019 season. He was outrighted off of the Mariners roster on October 28. He became a free agent following the 2019 season. He re-signed with the Mariners on January 15, 2020. He became a free agent on November 2, 2020.

Atlanta Braves
On March 15, 2021, Bradford signed a minor league contract with the Atlanta Braves organization.

High Point Rockers
On April 21, 2022, Bradford signed with the High Point Rockers of the Atlantic League of Professional Baseball.

He retired from professional baseball on September 22, 2022.

References

External links

1989 births
Living people
Sportspeople from Las Vegas
Baseball players from Nevada
Major League Baseball pitchers
New York Mets players
Seattle Mariners players
Southern Nevada Coyotes baseball players
UCF Knights baseball players
Kingsport Mets players
High Point Rockers players
Savannah Sand Gnats players
St. Lucie Mets players
Binghamton Mets players
Scottsdale Scorpions players
Las Vegas 51s players
Gigantes de Carolina players
Tacoma Rainiers players